Un Abridgment des plusiers Cases et Resolutions del Common Ley, Alphabeticalment Digest desouth severall Titles (called Rolle's Abridgment, abbreviated Roll. Abr.) is a law book written in Law French by Henry Rolle (1589–1656). The most recent edition was published in 1668, with an English-language preface.

Marvin's Legal Bibliography states:

References

Sources

Citations

Law books
1668 books